Tin hydroxide may refer to:
Tin(II) hydroxide, also known as stannous hydroxide
Tin(IV) hydroxide, also known as stannic hydroxide